Schindalmonotus is a genus of bristle millipede containing the sole species Schindalmonotus hystrix known from South Africa and Mozambique. Individuals are up to 4 mm long and have 12 body segments and 17 pairs of legs. The species was described by Austrian zoologist Carl Attems in 1928.

References

Polyxenida
Millipedes of Africa
Monotypic arthropod genera